Michele Felice Cornè (1752–1845) was an artist born in Elba who settled in the United States. He lived in Salem and Boston, Massachusetts; and in Newport, Rhode Island. He painted marine scenes, portraits, and interior decorations such as fireboards and murals.

Biography
Cornè grew up in Naples. Drafted by the Neapolitan army to help repel the brief French occupation of Naples in 1799, he fled and was brought to the United States on the ship Mount Vernon, commanded by Elias Hasket Derby Jr., and settled in Salem, Massachusetts in 1800. After his arrival, he lived at Captain Derby's house, which he inherited from the recent death of his father.  The location of the mansion remains, but the home was torn down in 1815. On that spot is Old Town Hall which was designed by Charles Bulfinch and dedicated by President James Monroe in 1816 on his New England tour to keep the country together after the Hartford Convention which was organized by Timothy Pickering and his Essex Junto.
Cornè moved to Boston in 1807 and lived and worked there until 1822.

In 1806 he created a large "panorama" or panoramic painting, 10 feet high by 60 feet long, of the Bombardment of Tripoli, commemorating American victory in the First Barbary War (1801-1805). (This panoramic version may have been adapted from a smaller (81 x 122 cm) oil painting in the collection of the Maine Historical Society.) The work was exhibited in December 1806 at the Concert Hall in Boston, after which it traveled to Portsmouth, N.H. and Portland, Maine. It was later displayed as a part of a larger Panorama of the Battle of Bunker Hill exhibition at Washington Hall in Salem.

In 1810 he painted the wall murals at the Sullivan Dorr house in Providence, Rhode Island.  After the historic battle of USS Constitution vs HMS Guerriere on August 19, 1812, Cornè created a series of four paintings showing four key events in the battle.  All four paintings are in the collection of the Peabody Essex Museum, Salem, MA.

In 1822 Cornè relocated to Newport, Rhode Island.  His house in Newport still stands on Cornè Street.  He lived there until his death in 1845 at the age of 93.  He was buried in the Common Burial Ground in Newport.

Legacy
Examples of his work are in the collections of Historic New England; Museum of Fine Arts, Boston; Peabody Essex Museum; Redwood Library and Athenaeum; and U.S. Naval Academy Museum. Interior murals painted by Cornè survive in the Sullivan Dorr house, Providence, Rhode Island.  One of his students was the noted maritime artist George Ropes.

Cornè and tomatoes
It is reputed that Cornè introduced the tomato into the American diet.  In early 19th century New England tomatoes were thought to be deadly poison.  Cornè was accustomed to eating tomatoes in his native land and would regularly eat them without ill effect and, thus, allayed the fears of the residents of his adopted country.

The tomato is native to western South America, and was formally cultivated by the Aztecs and other peoples in Mesoamerica.

See also
 Robert Gibbon Johnson, another early American advocate of eating tomatoes

References

Further reading
 Little, Nina Fletcher and Philip C.F. Smith, Michele Felice Cornè, 1752-1845, Versatile Neapolitan Painter of Salem, Boston and Newport, exhibition catalogue, Peabody Museum of Salem, 1972.
 "Died," Newport Mercury, 12 July 1845.
 "Michele Felice Corne," Newport Mercury, 3 March 1877.
 "The First Tomatoes," Newport Daily News, 29 January 1879.
 Dodge, Donald. "The Cornè House, ca. 1799-1822," Newport History: Bulletin of the Newport Historical Society. Newport Historical Society. Vol.42, Part 1, No.133 (Winter 1969). 14-21.
 Mason, George Champlin. Reminiscences of Newport. Newport: Charles E. Hammett Jr., 1884. 330-340.
 Donald J. Boisvert. "Michel Felice Corne: the first person in America to eat a tomato, Old Rhode Island no.4, 1993.
 Smith, Andrew F. The Tomato in America: Early History, Culture, and Cookery. Columbia, SC: University of South Carolina Press, 1994.

External links
 WorldCat. Cornè, Michele Felice 1752-1845
 Maine Historical Society  Bombardment of Tripoli oil painting, 81 x 122 cm.
 Library of Congress. Bombardment of Tripoli engraving by Cornè.
 Historic American Buildings Survey (Library of Congress). Sullivan Dorr House, 109 Benefit Street, Providence, Rhode Island. Includes information about mural by Cornè.

1757 births
1845 deaths
18th-century Neapolitan people
19th-century American painters
American male painters
American marine artists
Artists from Newport, Rhode Island
Artists from Boston
Italian emigrants to the United States
Italian marine artists
Orientalist painters
Painters from Naples
Painters from Massachusetts
Painters from Rhode Island
People from North End, Boston
People from the Province of Livorno
Burials at Common Burying Ground and Island Cemetery
19th-century American male artists